The 2022 Nicholls Colonels baseball team represented Nicholls State University during the 2022 NCAA Division I baseball season. The Colonels played their home games at Ben Meyer Diamond at Ray E. Didier Field and were led by first–year head coach Mike Silva. They were members of the Southland Conference.

Preseason

Southland Conference Coaches Poll
The Southland Conference Coaches Poll was released on February 10, 2022 and the Colonels were picked to finish tied for seventh in the conference with 24 votes.

Preseason All-Southland Team & Honors

Second Team
Austin Cain – 3rd Base

Personnel

Schedule and results

Schedule Source:
*Rankings are based on the team's current ranking in the D1Baseball poll.

References

Nicholls Colonels
Nicholls Colonels baseball seasons
Nicholls Colonels baseball